The 2013 NEAFL season was the third season of the North East Australian Football League (NEAFL). The Brisbane Lions reserves were the premiers for the season after they defeated the Sydney Swans reserves by 8 points in the Grand Final.

League structure
The league is split into two divisions called the Northern Conference and the Eastern Conference. The two teams who win their respective Conference finals series meet in the Grand Final.

Participating clubs

Regular season

Round 1

Round 2

Round 3

Round 4

Round 5

Round 6

Round 7

Round 8

Round 9

Round 10

Round 11

Round 12

Round 13

Round 14

Round 15

Round 16

Round 17

Round 18

Round 19

Round 20

Round 21

Round 22

Ladder

Finals series

Week 1

Week 2

Week 3

Week 4

Week 5

State games
The two NEAFL conferences participated in state games in 2013, with the NEAFL Eastern Conference (NSW/ACT) competing against the Tasmanian State League and the NEAFL Northern Conference (QLD/NT) competing against the South Australian National Football League.

Foxtel Cup

Three NEAFL clubs were extended an invitation to compete in the Foxtel Cup knockout competition for 2013. These clubs were 2012 Northern Conference runners up Northern Territory, 2012 Eastern Conference premiers  and 2012 Northern Conference third-ranked team . Their results are shown below:

Qualifying round

Round 1

Awards

Eastern conference

Northern conference

Team of the year

Eastern conference

Northern conference

AFL draftees

R – rookie draft

References

External links
http://www.neafl.com.au/ Official NEAFL website

Australian rules football competition seasons
NEAFL